The Open Source Security Foundation (OpenSSF) is a cross-industry forum for a collaborative effort to improve open-source software security.

The list of founding governing board members includes GitHub, Google, IBM, JPMorgan Chase, Microsoft, NCC Group, OWASP Foundation and Red Hat. Other founding members include GitLab, HackerOne, Intel, Okta, Purdue, Uber, and VMware.

The OpenSSF is part of the Linux Foundation. It is the successor to the Core Infrastructure Initiative, another Linux Foundation project.

See also

 Computer security
 Open Security Foundation

References

External links

Free software project foundations in the United States
Organizations established in 2020